Léopold Standaert was a sailor from Belgium, who represented his native country at the 1920 Summer Olympics in Ostend, Belgium in the 8 Metre.

Further reading

References

Sailors at the 1920 Summer Olympics – 8 Metre
Sailors at the 1924 Summer Olympics – 6 Metre
Belgian male sailors (sport)
Olympic sailors of Belgium
Year of birth missing
Year of death missing
Olympic bronze medalists for Belgium
Place of birth missing